Identity Crisis is the second studio album by Christian rap artist, Tedashii. It was released on May 26, 2009 after being pushed back from its originally scheduled May 19, 2009 release date.

Conception

Background
Tedashii based the title of the album on 1 Corinthians 15:10.

"But by the grace of God I am what I am, and his grace to me was not without effect."

Release and promotion
The album, initially intended for a May 19, 2008 release date, was pushed back to May 26, 2009 by Reach Records. In order to make up for the delay, Reach Records made two left over tracks from the album freely available online.

The album's second single, "I'm a Believer", featuring label mate Trip Lee and Soyé was released on iTunes on April 30, 2009.

Track listing

Charts

References

2009 albums
Tedashii albums
Reach Records albums
Albums produced by Gawvi
Albums produced by DJ Official